Cathy Moriarty (born November 29, 1960) is an American actress and singer whose career spans over 40 years. For her work in Martin Scorsese's 1980 film Raging Bull, she received nominations for the Academy Award for Best Supporting Actress, the Golden Globe Award for Best Supporting Actress – Motion Picture, and the BAFTA Award.

Throughout her career, she has worked with a number of prolific directors including Martin Scorsese, Sidney Lumet, Ivan Reitman, Harold Ramis, James Mangold, and Richard Ayoade. Her other film appearances include Neighbors, White of the Eye, Soapdish, Casper, Cop Land, Analyze That, The Bounty Hunter, The Double, and Patti Cake$.

Moriarty has also starred in numerous television roles including Tales from the Crypt, Law & Order, Law & Order: Special Victims Unit, Law & Order: Criminal Intent, The Assassination of Gianni Versace: American Crime Story, and City on a Hill.

Early life
Moriarty was born November 29, 1960 in The Bronx borough of New York City, the daughter of Irish Catholic immigrants Catherine, a homemaker, and John Moriarty, a warehouse worker. She was raised in Yonkers, New York, where she attended Lincoln High School. When she was 18 years old, her friends urged her to enter a bathing-beauty contest at a bar:

Career

Moriarty made her film debut in Martin Scorsese's Raging Bull (1980), as Vikki LaMotta, wife of boxer Jake LaMotta, played by Robert De Niro. She was nominated for the Academy Award for Best Supporting Actress. Later, Moriarty played John Belushi's destructive, sultry neighbor in Neighbors, a film adaptation of Thomas Berger's novel of the same name. In 1982, she was severely injured in an automobile accident and required back surgery.

In 1985, Moriarty agreed to co-star with Jack Nicholson in The Two Jakes. However, after one day of shooting its production halted. Although the film was eventually released in 1990, Moriarty was no longer connected with the production. Moriarty returned to acting in 1987. Her first role since Neighbors was in the British thriller film White of the Eye, in which Moriarty played the wife of David Keith's character. Two years later, she appeared in the CBS series Wiseguy.

Moriarty began the decade with roles in the thriller film Burndown, Arnold Schwarzenegger's Kindergarten Cop and the soap opera parody Soapdish. She also appeared in the musical drama The Mambo Kings and the horror anthology TV series Tales from the Crypt, where Moriarty's performance earned her a Best Actress in a Dramatic Series CableACE Award. Her last performance of the year was a hard-as-nails prostitute in the screwball comedy film, The Gun in Betty Lou's Handbag. In 1993, Moriarty starred as John Goodman's wisecracking girlfriend and a film goddess in Joe Dante's period comedy Matinee, and had supporting roles in the comedies Another Stakeout (the sequel of 1987's Stakeout) and Me and the Kid. The following year, she guest-starred as half of the husband-wife con team in Universal's film Another Midnight Run. The actress' next role was the flirty barfly in Peter Medak's adventure film, Pontiac Moon (1994).

Moriarty played Lois opposite Debra Winger and Billy Crystal in the romantic comedy Forget Paris (1995), followed by the vindictive Carrigan Crittenden in the live action film Casper. Shortly afterwards she starred with Andrew Dice Clay in the CBS series Bless This House. That year Moriarty also played Hedy Burress's mother in Foxfire, the film adaptation of Joyce Carol Oates' novel. The next year, she played the alcoholic mother of a successful boxer in Opposite Corners; the mother of two sons (one a police officer and the other a crack addict) in A Brother's Kiss; a former exotic dancer and Brad Hunt's aunt in Dream with the Fishes; Mary Stuart Masterson and Evan Rachel Wood's seriously-ill, alcoholic mother in Digging to China; Michael Rapaport's aunt in Cop Land and Alyssa Milano's mother in Hugo Pool.

Moriarty voiced characters in the animated TV series Stories from My Childhood episodes "The Golden Rooster" and "The Wild Swans" and the animated series Recess. Other appearances included Hilary Duff's witch aunt in the film Casper Meets Wendy,  Randy Quaid's wife in the film P.U.N.K.S., and Sharon Stone's friend in the Sidney Lumet film Gloria (a 1999 remake of the 1980 film written and directed by John Cassavetes). Roles followed in Crazy in Alabama, a film adaptation of Mark Childress's 1993 novel of the same name; New Waterford Girl, a Canadian comedy-drama, and the satirical film But I'm a Cheerleader. Moriarty played an FBI agent in Red Team, an abusive adoptive mother in the family film Prince of Central Park and a woman who fears death in Next Stop, Eternity. Other roles included a widow suspected of killing her husband on Law & Order, crime boss Patti LoPresti in the Mafia comedy film (and sequel to 1999's Analyze This) Analyze That and a controlling mother on Law & Order: Special Victims Unit. 

Following Analyze That, Moriarty took a break from acting to raise her children. In 2010, she returned to the big screen to play a bookie who sends two thugs to kill the main characters (Jennifer Aniston and Gerard Butler) in the romantic-action-comedy film The Bounty Hunter. On July 18, 2010, the Long Island International Film Expo honored the actress with its Long Island Creative Achievement Award. Shortly afterwards, she guest-starred as Annalisa Gentili on Law & Order: Criminal Intent. The next year, Moriarty appeared as a nurse in the film 1320. In 2013 she played Armand Assante's wife in Once Upon a Time in Brooklyn and a sarcastic waitress in a black comedy, The Double opposite Jesse Eisenberg and Mia Wasikowska. She returned to Law & Order: Special Victims Unit as Lieutenant Toni Howard for two episodes: season 14's "Poisoned Motive" and season 15's "Amaro's One-Eighty".

Moriarty made an appearance as Michael Pitt's bitter, estranged mother in the crime drama Rob the Mob. The same year she appeared as the co-owner of a house who shares a dark secret in Deborah Twiss's psychological thriller A Cry from Within (Sebastien) and the title character in Ante Novakovic's short film, Tammy, about a mother-son relationship which evolves over the course of a Sunday visit. Moriarty's performance earned a nomination for Best Actress at the Jersey Shore Shorts Film Festival. Since then, Moriarty has regularly performed in both film and on television, with major roles in Patti Cake$, an official selection of the Sundance Film Festival, as well as the Ryan Murphy series American Crime Story and City on a Hill.

Personal life
In 1981, Moriarty married theatrical manager Carmine D'Anna and moved into a home in Malibu, California. On April 2, 1992, it was reported that Moriarty and D'Anna were divorcing and D'Anna sought $1 million under California's community property laws.

Moriarty was engaged to Richie Palmer, her business partner in the Mulberry Street pizzeria chain, until he left her for Raquel Welch in October 1997. Belying stereotypes, the "other woman" Welch was actually 14 years older than Palmer and 20 years older than Moriarty.

On August 28, 1999, Moriarty and financier Joseph Gentile married on Long Island. She gave birth to twins Catherine Patricia Gentile and Joseph John Gentile on September 11, 2000, and on November 15, 2001, the couple's third child, Annabella “Bella” Rose Gentile, was born.

Filmography

Film

Television

Awards and nominations

References

External links
 Biography of Cathy Moriarty from Starpulse
 

1960 births
Actresses from New York City
American film actresses
American television actresses
American voice actresses
American people of Irish descent
Living people
People from the Bronx
People from Yonkers, New York
20th-century American actresses
21st-century American actresses